Mikhail Chachba (1930 – 1967) was a diver from Russia. He competed in the 10 m platform at the 1952 and 1956 Summer Olympics and finished in 17th place and 8th place, respectively. He won silver medals in this discipline at the European championships in 1954 and 1958.

References

1930 births
1967 deaths
Olympic divers of the Soviet Union
Divers at the 1952 Summer Olympics
Divers at the 1956 Summer Olympics
Soviet male divers